The 2019 Rhythmic Gymnastics World Championships was held in Baku, Azerbaijan from 16 September to 22 September 2019. The competition took place at the National Gymnastics Arena and served as a qualifier to the 2020 Olympic Games. There were Olympic berths awarded to 16 individuals and 5 groups. There were 301 participating athletes from 61 countries. 

Dina Averina from Russia won gold medals in ball, clubs, and ribbon, and Ekaterina Selezneva won the hoop title. Averina, Selezneva and Arina Averina won Russia's tenth consecutive World team title. In the all-around finals, Dina Averina won her third consecutive World all-around title, becoming the fifth rhythmic gymnast to do so. The Russian group then won their fourth consecutive all-around title, and Japan matched their best-ever result with the silver medal. Japan then won the gold medal in 5 balls, their first ever gold medal in the group event, and Russia won the 3 hoops + 4 clubs final.

Participating nations

Schedule

 Monday, September 16
 12:00 - 18:50 Individual Qualification - Hoop and Ball
 19:15 - 20:00 Opening Ceremony
 Tuesday, September 17
 10:00 - 17:00 Individual Qualification - Hoop and Ball
 19:30 - 20:00 Individual Hoop Final
 20:05 - 20:35 Individual Ball Final
 Wednesday, September 18
 12:00 - 20:50 Individual Qualification - Clubs and Ribbon
 Thursday, September 19 
 09:00 - 17:50 Individual Qualification - Clubs and Ribbon
 19:30 - 20:00 Individual Clubs Final
 20:05 - 20:35 Individual Ribbon Final
 Friday, September 20 
 14:30 - 20:35 Individual All Around Final
 Saturday, September 21 
 14:30 - 18:10 Group All Around
 Sunday, September 22 
 14:30 - 15:15 Group 5 Balls Final
 15:15 - 16:00 Group 3 Hoops and 2 Pairs of Clubs Final
 16:15 - 16:45 Closing Ceremony

Medal summary

* reserve gymnast

Medal table

Individual medal table

Individual

Team 
The team event took in account the qualification results.

Individual Qualification
 The top 8 scores in each apparatus qualified to the apparatus finals, and the top 24 in overall qualification scores advanced to the all-around final.
 Only the 3 best results are counted in the total score
 Only the 2 highest-ranking gymnasts from each country can qualify to each of the finals.

All-around
The top 16 gymnasts earned their NOCs a qualification spot at the all-around individual event of the 2020 Summer Olympics.

Hoop

Ball

Clubs

Ribbon

Groups

Squads

Group All-Around
The top 8 scores in each apparatus qualified to the group apparatus finals. The top 5 teams in this list that are not already qualified for the 2020 Summer Olympics (Russia, Bulgaria, and Italy) qualified a team for the group all-around event at the 2020 Olympics.

5 Balls

3 Hoops + 4 Clubs

References

Rhythmic Gymnastics World Championships
Rhythmic Gymnastics World Championships
Rhythmic Gymnastics
Gymnastics Championships
Sport in Baku
Gymnastics in Azerbaijan